This is a list of islands of Israel, from North to South:
Rosh HaNikra Islands
Shahaf
Nachlieli
Tchelet
Achziv Islands
Achziv Island. Popular name in Israel is "Love Island". Legal to access.
Chegafyoun
Achziv Reef
Hof Dor Islands, Dor
Shchafit
Dor
Tefet
Hofmi
Yonim Island, Ma'agan Michael
Caesarea Islands, Caesarea
Mikhmoret Rock, Mikhmoret
Andromeda Rock, Jaffa, Tel Aviv. Near the entrance of Jaffa Port. 
Adam Rock, Bat Yam.

Lake islands
 Dead Tree Salt Island in the Ein Bokek basin of the Dead Sea
 Kinneret Island in the Sea of Galilee

References

Israel, List of islands of
 Islands of Israel
Islands